The Lipovets uezd was one of the subdivisions of the Kiev Governorate of the Russian Empire. It was situated in the southwestern part of the governorate. Its administrative centre was Lipovets (Lypovets).

Demographics
At the time of the Russian Empire Census of 1897, Lipovetsky Uyezd had a population of 211,825. Of these, 82.0% spoke Ukrainian, 15.0% Yiddish, 1.9% Polish and 1.1% Russian as their native language.

References

 
Uezds of Kiev Governorate
1795 establishments in the Russian Empire
1923 disestablishments in Ukraine